Joseph Louis Sanchez is an American politician who served in the New Mexico House of Representatives from January 17, 2019 to January 19, 2021. Prior to entering state politics, Sanchez was an electrical engineer. He is a member of the Democratic Party.

Early life and education
Sanchez was born and raised in Alcalde, New Mexico, a small farming community in Northern New Mexico. Sanchez earned a Bachelor of Science in electrical engineering from the University of New Mexico and two master's degrees, one in electrical engineering from the University of New Mexico and one in business administration, from New Mexico State University.

Career 
Sanchez was elected to the New Mexico House of Representatives in the 2018 elections. He is running for the  seat in the United States House of Representatives in the 2020 elections. Sanchez finished third in the June 2, Democratic primary.

Results

Personal life 
Sanchez lives in Alcalde, New Mexico.

References

External links

Living people
Democratic Party members of the New Mexico House of Representatives
Year of birth missing (living people)
People from Rio Arriba County, New Mexico
Hispanic and Latino American state legislators in New Mexico
University of New Mexico alumni
New Mexico State University alumni
21st-century American politicians